Jacob Shawn Marisnick (born March 30, 1991) is an American professional baseball outfielder in the Chicago White Sox organization. He has previously played in MLB for the Chicago Cubs, Miami Marlins, Houston Astros, New York Mets, San Diego Padres and Pittsburgh Pirates. The Toronto Blue Jays drafted Marisnick in the third round of the 2009 MLB draft.

Early career
Marisnick attended Riverside Polytechnic High School in Riverside, California. He excelled for the school's baseball team, and was initially expected to be a first-round choice in the upcoming Major League Baseball (MLB) Draft. However, he struggled during showcase events, and had a .406 batting average as a senior, lower than his batting average in his sophomore and junior years. He committed to attend the University of Oregon on a college baseball scholarship.

The Toronto Blue Jays drafted Marisnick in the third round of the 2009 MLB draft. Rather than attend Oregon, Marisnick signed with the Blue Jays, receiving a $1 million signing bonus, more than double the suggested bonus for a player drafted at that position.

Before the 2012 season, MLB.com rated Marisnick as the 58th-best prospect in baseball. On November 19, 2012, Marisnick was traded to the Miami Marlins along with Adeiny Hechavarria, Henderson Álvarez, Yunel Escobar, Jeff Mathis, Anthony DeSclafani, and Justin Nicolino, in exchange for Mark Buehrle, Josh Johnson, José Reyes, John Buck, and Emilio Bonifacio. On January 29, 2013, Marisnick was named number 70 on MLB's Top 100 Prospects list.

Major league career

Miami Marlins
On July 23, 2013, the Marlins promoted Marisnick and Christian Yelich to the major leagues from the Double-A Jacksonville Suns. Marisnick recorded his first major league hit on July 26, 2013, off Pittsburgh Pirates pitcher Jeff Locke. Marisnick hit his first career home run in a game against Jenrry Mejia of the New York Mets on July 31, 2013.

The Marlins optioned Marisnick to the New Orleans Zephyrs of the Class AAA Pacific Coast League on March 27, 2014. He was recalled on June 16 when Christian Yelich was added to the disabled list.

Houston Astros
On July 31, 2014, the Marlins traded Marisnick, Colin Moran, Francis Martes, and a compensatory draft pick to the Houston Astros for Jarred Cosart, Enrique Hernández, and Austin Wates. Marisnick played in 51 games for the Astros in 2014, compiling a batting average of .272 with 3 home runs, 19 RBI, and 6 stolen bases.  He also displayed strong defense while playing the outfield, with a fielding percentage of .984 and a range factor of 2.57.

He made his first opening day MLB start for the Astros on April 6, 2015.  He finished the 2015 season with an average of .236 and OPS of .665 over 133 games and 339 at bats.

After a slow start to the 2016 season he was optioned to the Triple-A affiliate of the Astros, the Fresno Grizzlies of the Pacific Coast League, on April 25, 2016.

Marisnick was recalled by the Houston Astros on May 5, 2016. After former Astros center fielder Carlos Gómez was designated for assignment, Marisnick and Tony Kemp began sharing center field duties in his place.

In 106 games of 2017, Marisnick finished with a .243 batting average, 16 home runs, and 35 RBIs. With the Astros finishing the year 101–61, the team clinched the AL West pennant, and eventually won the 2017 World Series, their first ever. Marisnick did not participate in any postseason action due to injury, but was still on the 40-man roster at the time, and won his first championship title.

On July 7, 2018, he was sent down to AAA for the second time in the season, after struggling at the plate. In 2018 with Houston he batted .211/.275/.399.

On July 7, 2019, while trying to score on a fly out, Marisnick collided with catcher Jonathan Lucroy of the Los Angeles Angels at home plate and was called out for violating Official Baseball Rule 6.01(i).  Lucroy had a concussion and a broken nose as a result of the collision, and Marisnick was suspended for two games for the violation (pending appeal), although the collision was deemed unintentional.  On July 18, 2019, at an away game against the Angels, Marisnick was hit by a pitch by Angels reliever Noé Ramirez in the high back, though the pitch was going for his head. Marisnick did not charge the mound or retaliate but went to 1st base. At first base first baseman Albert Pujols had an argument with the angered Astros dugout. Ramirez and Angels manager Brad Ausmus were suspended, Ramirez for three games and Ausmus for one. On July 29 it was announced that Marisnick had lost his appeal for his two-game suspension.

In 2019 he batted .233/.289/.411 with 10 home runs and 34 RBIs in 292 at bats.

New York Mets
On December 5, 2019, Marisnick was traded to the New York Mets in exchange for left-handed pitcher Blake Taylor and outfielder Kenedy Corona. Marisnick played in 16 games for the Mets in 2020, hitting .333/.353/.606 with 2 home runs over 33 at-bats.

Chicago Cubs
On February 20, 2021, Marisnick agreed to a one-year, $1.5 million contract with the Chicago Cubs.

San Diego Padres
On July 30, 2021, Marisnick was traded to the San Diego Padres in exchange for Anderson Espinoza.

Texas Rangers
On March 14, 2022, Marisnick signed a minor league deal with the Texas Rangers. Marisnick was released by the Rangers organization on April 5.

Pittsburgh Pirates
On April 6, 2022, Marisnick signed a one year major league deal with the Pittsburgh Pirates. Jake Marisnick will under go thumb surgery, it's suspected it was caused after a diving play  in the outfield during a game on May 9 against the Los Angeles Dodgers. As during the diving play on May 9 he grabbed his thumb in pain, and later left the game. On August 7, 2022, Marisnick was released by the Pirates.

Atlanta Braves
On August 31, 2022, Marisnick signed a minor league deal with the Atlanta Braves. In 17 games for the Triple-A Gwinnett Stripers down the stretch, Marisnick slashed .235/.297/.324 with one home run and 3 RBI. He elected free agency on November 10.

Chicago White Sox
On January 10, 2023, Marisnick signed a minor league contract with the Chicago White Sox organization.

References

External links

1991 births
Living people
Baseball players from Riverside, California
Major League Baseball outfielders
Miami Marlins players
Houston Astros players
New York Mets players
Chicago Cubs players
San Diego Padres players
Pittsburgh Pirates players
Gulf Coast Blue Jays players
Lansing Lugnuts players
Dunedin Blue Jays players
New Hampshire Fisher Cats players
Jupiter Hammerheads players
Jacksonville Suns players
New Orleans Zephyrs players
Salt River Rafters players
Fresno Grizzlies players
Riverside Polytechnic High School alumni